Sebastián Obregón (died 8 January 1559) was a Roman Catholic prelate who served as Auxiliary Bishop of Seville (1534–1559).

Biography
Obregón was ordained a priest in the Order of Saint Benedict. On 2 December 1534, he was appointed during the papacy of Pope Paul III as Auxiliary Bishop of Seville and Titular Bishop of Marocco o Marruecos. In 1535, he was consecrated bishop by Alonso Manrique de Lara y Solís, Archbishop of Seville. He served as Auxiliary Bishop of Seville until his death on 8 January 1559.

References

External links and additional sources
 (for Chronology of Bishops) 
 (for Chronology of Bishops) 

1559 deaths
16th-century Roman Catholic bishops in Spain
Bishops appointed by Pope Paul III
Benedictine bishops